Vivian Cheung is a British media figure. She is co-owner of the Titan Entertainment Group, which publishes Titan Comics and Titan Books, and owns the UK’s Forbidden Planet retail chain.

Dr. Cheung, a fantasy and pop culture expert, co-owns Titan Entertainment Group with her business partner and husband, Nick Landau.

Career

Titan Entertainment Group 
Dr. Cheung set up the Titan Entertainment Group (TEG) in 1993 with Nick Landau. The group now includes the Forbidden Planet mega stores (including the flagship London store), Titan Books, Titan Comics and Titan Merchandise.

References

External links
 Forbidden Planet official site
 Titan Books official site
 Titan Comics official site

Interviews
 An interview with Nick Landau and Vivian Cheung at sci-fi-online.com
 Den of Geek: Nick Landau discusses his Titan/Forbidden Planet partnership with Vivian Cheung
 Financial Times: interview with Titan's owners Nick Landau & Vivian Cheung
Review Graveyard: Titan Entertainment's Vivian Cheung and Nick Landau
 ICV2: Titan's Vivian Cheung and Nick Landau discuss Titan Publishing's roots and expansion
ICV2: Titan's Vivian Cheung and Nick Landau discuss Titan Entertainment's various channels, their merchandise business and future plans

Year of birth missing (living people)
Living people
Titan Entertainment Group
21st-century British businesspeople
21st-century British businesswomen
British publishers (people)